Kimberly Tanner is an American biologist and professor at San Francisco State University (SFSU) in San Francisco, California. Tanner is an elected fellow of the American Society for Cell Biology and the co-editor-in-chief for the journal CBE: Life Sciences Education.

Education and career 
Tanner received her bachelor's degree in biochemistry at Rice University in Houston, Texas in 1991. She received her Ph.D. in neuroscience at University of California, San Francisco in 1997.  Tanner was under the advisement of Jon Levine where she used a combination of molecular, biochemical, behavioral and electrophysiological techniques to evaluate mechanisms that underlie pain and analgesia in mouse models. Following her Ph.D. she was a postdoctoral fellow at Stanford University and the University of California, San Francisco. In 2004 she moved to San Francisco State University where, as of 2022 she is a professor of biology.

Tanner is a founding member of the editorial board and, as of 2022, co-editor-in chief for CBE: Life Sciences Education.

Research 
Tanner's research focuses on biology and science education research, specifically on developing assessment tools to understand how people from K-12 to practicing scientists conceptualize science. Her Ph.D. dissertation focused on the structure and function of vincristine-induced neuropathy in mouse models. Her subsequent research was on metacognition and how students learn biology and thinking like biologists, teaching strategies in biology classrooms, and barriers to change in biology education in the classroom. She has also worked on DART, the Decibel Analysis Research in Teaching, a software tool that analyzes classroom sound.

Selected publications

References

External links 
 

Year of birth missing (living people)
Living people
American biologists
San Francisco State University faculty
Rice University alumni
University of California, San Francisco alumni